Leeds Hunslet Lane railway station was opened by the North Midland Railway in Leeds in 1840 in what was then a middle-class area, south of the city.

Designed by Francis Thompson, the trainshed consisted of an iron roof in four spans, with five lines running into it. Turntables were provided at each end and the offices on the western side were fronted by an arcade with an arch surmounted with the arms of Leeds, Sheffield and Derby.

It was shared by the Manchester and Leeds Railway, which ran on the NMR tracks from just north of Normanton since Parliament had refused to sanction two lines running side by side.

It was replaced by the Midland Railway in 1846 by Leeds Wellington railway station and became a goods depot which closed in 1972. The site is now occupied by the Crown Point Retail Park, which opened in 1989.

References

Disused railway stations in Leeds
Former Midland Railway stations
Railway stations in Great Britain opened in 1840
Railway stations in Great Britain closed in 1851
Francis Thompson railway stations